Conhelo Department is a department of Argentina in La Pampa Province.  The chief city of the department is Conhelo.

References

Departments of La Pampa Province